Greece competed at the 1988 Winter Olympics in Calgary, Alberta, Canada.

Competitors
The following is the list of number of competitors in the Games.

Alpine skiing

Men

Men's combined

Women

Cross-country skiing

Men

C = Classical style, F = Freestyle

References 

 Official Olympic Reports
 Olympic Winter Games 1988, full results by sports-reference.com

Nations at the 1988 Winter Olympics
1988
Olympics